Saint-Jean-Baptiste de Bastia is a church in Bastia, Haute-Corse, Corsica. The building was classified as a Historic Monument in 2000.

References

Churches in Corsica
Monuments historiques of Corsica
Buildings and structures in Haute-Corse